The 1982 Idaho gubernatorial election was held on November 2.  Incumbent Democrat John V. Evans narrowly defeated Republican nominee Phil Batt with 50.64% of the vote, the fourth of six consecutive wins for the Democratic party. 

Evans served nearly ten years as governor, then ran for the U.S. Senate in 1986.  Batt ran again for governor twelve years later in 1994 and won.

Primary elections
Primary elections were held on May 25, 1982.

Republican primary

Candidates
Phil Batt, incumbent Lieutenant Governor
Ralph Olmstead, Speaker of the Idaho House of Representatives

Results

General election

Candidates
John V. Evans, Democratic
Phil Batt, Republican

Results

References

1982
Idaho
Gubernatorial